Soso was a Chinese search engine owned by Tencent Holdings Limited, which is well known for its other creations Pengyou and QQ. , Soso was ranked as the 33rd most visited website in the world, the 11th most visited website in China, and the number eight most visited website in South Korea, according to Alexa Internet.

In September 2013, Tencent invested in Sogou, a subsidiary of Sohu. At this point, Soso discontinued services and now redirects to Sogou Search. Sogou also has search results in English which is powered by Bing.

References

External links

  Official webpage
English search

Internet search engines
Tencent
Chinese websites